The Mexibús Line II is a bus rapid transit (BRT) line in the Mexibús system. It operates between La Quebrada in Cuautitlán Izcalli and Las Américas in Ecatepec de Morelos. It was the second line to be built and the third to be opened. It was inaugurated by the governor of the State of Mexico, Eruviel Ávila on 12 January 2015 with 43 stations. The line has two different types of services, and both include a service exclusively for women and children named Servicio Rosa (Pink Service). The line operates with 97 buses.
On 8 October 2018, the Servicio Exprés was opened, going from Lechería to Ecatepec stations.

Until 15 December 2020, the line provided a provisional route from Las Américas to Indios Verdes metro station and it was later replaced with Line IV.

Stations

{| width="80%"  class="wikitable"
! colspan="2" align="center" width="30%"| Station
!align="center"|L
!align="center"|Ex
! align="center"| Location
! align="center"| Connection
! align="center"| Picture
! align="center"| Opened
|-
| rowspan="44" width="2%" bgcolor="CE1126" |  
|  Las Américas  
|align="center"|●
|align="center"|
| rowspan="16" | Ecatepec de Morelos
|
  Line I: 1° de mayo station
| 
| rowspan="42" | 12 January 2015
|-
|  1° de Mayo  
|align="center"|●
|align="center"|
| rowspan="2" |
| 
|-
|  San Martín  
|align="center"|●
|align="center"|
| 
|-
|  Puente de Fierro  
|align="center"|●
|align="center"|
|
  Line IV: Puente de Fierro station
| 
|-
|  Casa de Morelos  
|align="center"|●
|align="center"|
| rowspan="37" |
| 
|-
|  UPE  
|align="center"|●
|align="center"|
| 
|-
|  San Cristóbal  
|align="center"|●
|align="center"|
| 
|-
|  Agricultura  
|align="center"|●
|align="center"|
| 
|-
|  ISSEMYM  
|align="center"|●
|align="center"|
|
|-
|  El Carmen  
|align="center"|●
|align="center"|
|
|-
|  Ecatepec  
|align="center"|●
|align="center"|●
|
|-
|  DIF  
|align="center"|●
|align="center"|●
|
|-
|  Guadalupe Victoria  
|align="center"|●
|align="center"|●
|
|-
|  Venustiano Carranza  
|align="center"|●
|align="center"|
| 
|-
|  FOVISSSTE  
|align="center"|●
|align="center"|●
| 
|-
|  San Carlos  
|align="center"|●
|align="center"|
| 
|-
|  La Laguna  
|align="center"|●
|align="center"|●
| rowspan="11" | Coacalco de Berriozábal
| 
|-
|  Parque Residencial  
|align="center"|●
|align="center"|●
| 
|-
|  Eje 8  
|align="center"|●
|align="center"|●
| 
|-
|  1ª de Villa  
|align="center"|●
|align="center"|●
| 
|-
|  Las Flores Zacuautitla  
|align="center"|●
|align="center"|●
| 
|-
|  San Francisco  
|align="center"|●
|align="center"|●
| 
|-
|  Héroes-Canosas  
|align="center"|●
|align="center"|●
| 
|-
|  Coacalco-Tultepec  
|align="center"|●
|align="center"|●
| 
|-
|  Ex Hacienda San Felipe  
|align="center"|●
|align="center"|
| 
|-
|  Bosques del Valle  
|align="center"|●
|align="center"|●
| 
|-
|  Coacalco Berriozábal  
|align="center"|●
|align="center"|●
| 
|-
|  Santa María  
|align="center"|●
|align="center"|
| rowspan="16" | Tultitlán de Mariano Escobedo
| 
|-
|  Villas de San José  
|align="center"|●
|align="center"|●
| 
|-
|  Mariscala Real del Bosque  
|align="center"|●
|align="center"|●
| 
|-
|  Fuentes del Valle  
|align="center"|●
|align="center"|●
| 
|-
|  De la Cruz San Mateo  
|align="center"|●
|align="center"|
| 
|-
|  Cartagena  
|align="center"|●
|align="center"|●
| 
|-
|  Bello Horizonte  
|align="center"|●
|align="center"|
| 
|-
|  Bandera/Tultitlán  
|align="center"|●
|align="center"|●
| 
|-
|-
|  Buenavista  
|align="center"|●
|align="center"|
| 
|-
|  COCEM  
|align="center"|●
|align="center"|
| 
|-
|  Recursos Hidráulicos  
|align="center"|●
|align="center"|
| 
|-
|  Chilpan  
|align="center"|●
|align="center"|●
| 
|-
|  Ciudad Labor  
|align="center"|●
|align="center"|
| 
|-
|  Vidriera  
|align="center"|●
|align="center"|
| 
|-
|  Lechería  
|align="center"|●
|align="center"|
|rowspan="2"|
 Lechería
 Line 1: Lechería station
| 
|-
| Estación Retorno Oriente  
|align="center"|
|align="center"|●
| 
| 8 October 2018
|-
|  La Quebrada  
|align="center"|●
|align="center"|
| Cuautitlán Izcalli
|
 La Quebrada
| 
| 12 January 2015
|}

Incidents
On 12 April 2021, at 5:30 hours, a driver crashed into the turnstiles of FOVISSSTE station on Line 2. The station was empty and only the driver resulted injured.

Notes

References

External links
 

2015 establishments in Mexico
2